Calluga crassitibia is a moth in the  family Geometridae. It is found on Dammer Island (the Maluku Islands).

References

Moths described in 1901
Eupitheciini
Moths of Indonesia